Sophia Karen Edem Ackuaku is a Ghanaian politician and member of the Seventh Parliament of the Fourth Republic of Ghana representing the Domeabra-Obom Constituency in the Greater Accra Region on the ticket of the National Democratic Congress.

Early life and education 
Ackuaku was born on 7 October 1972. She hails from Anyako in the Volta Region of Ghana. Ackuaku has undergone a wide array of training which has earned her a certificate in public relation, advertisement and marketing from the Ghana Institute of Journalism. She also has a diploma in social work from the School of Social Work in Osu-Accra and a proficiency in Dutch Language from Zadkine College in Rotterdam, Holland. Ackuaku also has a certificate in leadership, human rights and HIV/AIDS from the Ark Foundation in Ghana.

Politics 
Sohia contested and won the parliamentary seat for the Domeabra-Obom Constituency in the 2016 Ghanaian general elections. She contested against four others namely Darison Barba Mohammed of the New Patriotic Party, Ekow Jones Mensah of the Conventions People's Party, Gideon Dudu of the Progressive People's Party and Pius Kwame Fiakuna an independent candidate. She won the election by obtaining 14,301 votes out of the 21,506 cast, representing 68.3 percent of the total valid votes cast. She currently serves as a member on the Food, Agriculture and Cocoa Affairs Committee and Poverty Reduction Strategy Committee.

Career 
Ackuaku's working life has spanned many areas. As a parliamentarian in the Ghanaian parliament, she has served on the Food, Agriculture and Cocoa Affairs Committee and the Poverty Reduction Strategy  Committee of parliament. Before her status as a member of the Ghanaian parliament, she has worked as the deputy executive director in charge of operations at the Ghana National Service Scheme, from 2013 to 2016. From 2004 to 2013 she worked as a managing director at Eligreen/Amsos Ghana Limited. Before this she has worked previously as a deputy manager at Golden Souvenir Lotto in the Northern Region of Ghana from 1995 to 2000 and as the FBWE focal person for the Federation of Business Women Entrepreneurs from 2001 to 2010.

Personal life 
Sophia Karen Edem Ackuaku is married with five children. She identifies with the Christian religion.

References

Ghanaian MPs 2017–2021
Living people
1972 births
Ghanaian MPs 2021–2025
National Democratic Congress (Ghana) politicians